Slevogt is a German language surname from the words Schlehe=sloe and Vogt=reeve. Notable people with the name include:
 Marquardt Slevogt (1909–1980), German ice hockey player
 Max Slevogt (1868–1932), German Impressionist painter and illustrator
 Paul Slevogt (1596–1655), German philologist

References 

German-language surnames